Chemokine (C-X-C motif) ligand 14 (CXCL14) is a small cytokine belonging to the CXC chemokine family that is also known as BRAK (for breast and kidney-expressed chemokine). Mature CXCL14 has many of the conserved features of the CXC chemokine subfamily but has some differences too, such as a shorter N-terminus and five extra amino acids in the region between its third and fourth cysteines.  CXCL14 is constitutively expressed at high levels in many normal tissues, where its cellular source is thought to be fibroblasts.
However, it is reduced or absent from most cancer cells.  This chemokine is chemotactic for monocytes and can activate these cells in the presence of an inflammatory mediator called prostaglandin-E2 (PGE2).  It is also a potent chemoattractant and activator of dendritic cells, is implicated in homing of these cells, and can stimulate the migration of activated NK cells. CXCL14 also inhibits angiogenesis, possibly as a result of its ability to block endothelial cell chemotaxis.  The gene for CXCL14 contains four exons and is located on chromosome 5 in humans.

References

Cytokines